The Killing Season is a 2015 Australian television three-part documentary series which analyses the events of the Rudd–Gillard Government of 2007–2013, a turbulent period of Australian political history. Journalist Sarah Ferguson interviewed the Australian Labor Party decision-makers and strategists who engaged in internal conflict that brought down a government which had successfully countered the post-2008 global financial crisis.

Ratings

Soundtrack
The soundtrack accompanying the opening titles and credits is the version of Schubert's Piano Trio No. 2 used in Stanley Kubrick's 1975 film Barry Lyndon.

Awards 
 Outstanding Public Affairs Report - 2016 Logie Awards 
 AACTA Award for Best Documentary or Factual Program

References

External links
 

Rudd Government
Gillard Government
2015 Australian television series debuts
2015 Australian television series endings
2010s Australian documentary television series